Midway is an unincorporated community in Mercer County, West Virginia, United States. Midway is located on County Route 11 near the northwest border of Bluefield.

References

Unincorporated communities in Mercer County, West Virginia
Unincorporated communities in West Virginia